Adonis A. Kyrou (18 October 1923, Athens – 4 November 1985, Paris) was a Greek filmmaker and writer, whose works often appeared under the name Ado Kyrou. He was the son of Achilleus A. Kyrou and grandson of Adonis Kyrou, owners and publishers of the newspaper Estia.

At the end of 1945 Kyrou moved to Paris, France in December 1945 along with many other Greek intellectuals on the Mataroa voyage. There he worked as a critic, filmmaker, and author of L'Âge d'or de la carte postale (1966), Amour - érotisme et cinéma (1957) and Le Surréalisme au cinéma (1953), the last two published by Eric Losfeld's publishing house Le Terrain Vague.

He was a contributor to the French film journal Positif.

Filmography
1957 : La Déroute, short film
1958 : Le Palais idéal, short film on the Palais idéal by Ferdinand Cheval
1959 : Le Havre, short film
1960 : La Chevelure, short film
1962 : Combat de coqs
1962 : La Paix et la vie
1963 : Les Immortelles
1964 : Un honnête homme
1965 : Bloko
1972 : The Monk

References

External links
 

1923 births
1985 deaths
French film directors
Greek emigrants to France
Film people from Athens
Writers from Athens